O todos en la cama is a Colombian sitcom produced by RCN TV and broadcast on Canal A from June 1994 until his cancellation in June 1997. The sitcom is about seven university students (five men and two women) from different regions sharing an apartment in Bogotá.

Story
Seven students from different regions of Colombia are reunited in a tiny apartment (Then a house). Despite their differences, they start a very strong friendship and start caring for each other. Even a relationship starts between Rebeca and Juan Manuel.

At the middle of their second year on the air (1996), Carlos Humberto Camacho and Andrea López left the series after being hired to star in the soap opera "Prisioneros del Amor". This forced changes in the story: "La Rana" and Juan Manuel fell in love and ran away. REbeca discovered that she was pregnant and fell in love with Pablo Caminos. At the end of the year, they married and their characters left the series. Actresses Sandra Muñoz ("Cristina"), Fabiana Medina ("Ana") and actor Guido MOlina ("Cacho") were introduced to the series, but lost steam and declining ratings led to their cancellation in June 1997.

Cast
Martha Restrepo as Rebeca Vega, veterinary student from Pereira, Juan Manuel's girlfriend
Andrea López as Inés Mercedes Videla, aka La rana, social communication student
Carlos Humberto Camacho as Juan Manuel Ríos, architecture student from Antioquia, Rebeca's boyfriend 
Oscar Salazar as Pablo Caminos, music student from Pasto
Freddy Flórez as Guillermo Leyes, law student from the Caribbean coast
Álvaro Castillo as Julián Bam Bam Corredor, student from Cali
Edwin Eissner as Eduardo Blanco, management student from Bogotá
Hernando el Chato Latorre as Armando Mesoneros
Paola Fernández as Selene
Bárbara Perea as Rafaela Mercado
María Margarita Giraldo as Eduardo's mother
Paula Ferrada as Chavela, Bam Bam'''s cousin
Fabiana Medina as Ana (last season)
Sandra Muñoz as Cristina (last season)
Guido Molina as Cacho'' (last season)

References

External links
 O todos en la cama, Ventas internacionales, RCN TV

Colombian television sitcoms
1994 Colombian television series debuts
1997 Colombian television series endings
1990s Colombian television series
RCN Televisión original programming
Spanish-language television shows
Television shows set in Colombia